Woodbourne is a historic home and farm located at Madison, Madison County, Virginia. The house was built between about 1805 and 1814, and is a two-story, gable-roofed brick structure. It has a front porch, a two-story frame wing attached to either gable end, and a one-story rear frame wing.  Adjacent to the house is the two-story, old kitchen building.  Also on the property are the contributing ruins of the foundation of the old barn.

It was listed on the National Register of Historic Places in 1999.

References

Houses on the National Register of Historic Places in Virginia
Farms on the National Register of Historic Places in Virginia
Houses completed in 1814
Houses in Madison County, Virginia
National Register of Historic Places in Madison County, Virginia